Eric Peter Hamilton (5 May 1913 – 15 July 1943) was a South African first-class cricketer and South African Air Force officer.

Hamilton was born in Johannesburg on 5 May 1913. His debut in cricket took place on 5 October 1936 for the City of Johannesburg against The Rest at the Old Wanderers. During the match, Hamilton scored 32 runs, but was dismissed both innings. Hamilton's second cricket match, representing Transvaal against the Orange Free State, occurred on 29–30 January 1937. During the first inning, Hamilton made 33 runs before he was dismissed by Henry Sparks.

During the Second World War, Hamilton enlisted in the South African Air Force and was commissioned as a lieutenant. Trained as a Martin Baltimore pilot, he was posted to No. 21 Squadron in Malta, where the squadron supported the Allied invasion of Sicily. During a daytime bombing mission on 15 July 1943, Hamilton and his two crew members were shot down and killed in Baltimore AG390. He is buried at the Syracuse War Cemetery.

References

Citations

Sources
 

1913 births
1943 deaths
Cricketers from Johannesburg
South African cricketers
Gauteng cricketers
South African World War II pilots
South African Air Force personnel of World War II
South African Air Force officers
Aviators killed by being shot down
South African military personnel killed in World War II
Aviators killed in aviation accidents or incidents in Italy
Victims of aviation accidents or incidents in 1943